The Encyclopedia of Cryptography and Security  is a comprehensive work on Cryptography for both information security professionals and experts in the fields of Computer Science, Applied Mathematics, Engineering, Information Theory, Data Encryption,  etc. It consists of 460 articles in alphabetical order and is available electronically and in print. The Encyclopedia has a representative Advisory Board consisting of 18 leading international specialists.

Topics include but are not limited to authentication and identification, copy protection, cryptoanalysis and security, factorization algorithms and primality tests, cryptographic protocols, key management, electronic payments and digital certificates, hash functions and MACs, elliptic curve cryptography, quantum cryptography and web security.

The style of the articles is of explanatory character and can be used for undergraduate or graduate courses.

Advisory board members
 Carlisle Adams, Entrust, Inc.
 Friedrich Bauer, Technische Universität München
 Gerrit Bleumer, Francotyp-Postalia
 Dan Boneh, Stanford University
 Pascale Charpin, INRIA-Rocquencourt
 Claude Crepeau, McGill University
 Yvo G. Desmedt, University College London (University of London)
 Grigory Kabatiansky, Institute for Information Transmission Problems
 Burt Kaliski, RSA Security
 Peter Landrock, University of Aarhus
 Patrick Drew McDaniel, Penn State University
 Alfred Menezes, University of Waterloo
 David Naccache, Gemplus
 Christof Paar, Ruhr-Universität Bochum
 Bart Preneel, Katholieke Universiteit Leuven
 Jean-Jacques Quisquater, Université Catholique de Louvain
 Kazue Sako, NEC Corporation
 Berry Schoenmakers, Technische Universiteit Eindhoven

References

Cryptography publications
Cryptography
Specialized encyclopedias